The Australian Indigenous Education Foundation (AIEF) is a non-profit organisation which provides scholarships to the Indigenous students in Australia.

History 
The Australian Indigenous Education Foundation was established in 2008 by Andrew Penfold. In 2002, as a result of Bali bombings he lost a few friends, which inspired him to lay the foundation of this organisation. He is also the chief executive officer of the organisation.

AIEF currently offers over 500 scholarship places at 34 educational partners as well as universities across Australia.

Campaigns
In May 2013, the Australian Indigenous Education Foundation launched an advertising campaign centred on the concept of Australia's first Indigenous Prime Minister, following Newspoll research which revealed that two thirds of Australians do not believe that they will see an Indigenous Prime Minister in their lifetime.

Partner Schools
Adelaide
Seymour College

Armidale
The Armidale School

Brisbane/Ipswich
Ipswich Girls' Grammar School
Ipswich Grammar School
Marist College Ashgrove
St Joseph's College, Nudgee
St Peters Lutheran College

Cairns
St Augustine's College (Queensland)
Saint Monica's High School, Cairns

Melbourne
Scotch College, Melbourne
Melbourne Grammar School

Perth
Aquinas College, Perth
Scotch College, Perth
Wesley College, Perth
PLC Perth

Sydney
Cranbrook School
Knox Grammar School
PLC Sydney
Pymble Ladies College
Kincoppal School
Loreto Normanhurst
St Catherine's School, Waverley
St Gregory's College, Campbelltown
St Vincent's College, Potts Point
Scots College (Sydney)

Toowoomba
Toowoomba Anglican School

Townsville
The Cathedral School

Tertiary partners
University of Technology Sydney
University of New South Wales

References

External links

Indigenous Australian education
Foundations based in Australia
Organisations serving Indigenous Australians
2008 establishments in Australia
Organizations established in 2008